Sir Hugh Munro, 4th Baronet (1856–1919) was a mountaineer who listed Scotland's mountains over 3,000 feet.

Hugh Munro may also refer to:
Hugh Munro, 9th Baron of Foulis (died 1425), Scottish soldier
Hugh Andrew Johnstone Munro of Novar (1797–1864), art collector and patron of J.M.W. Turner
Hugh Andrew Johnstone Munro (1819–1885), British classical scholar
Hugh Munro (trainer) (1858–1925), Australian racehorse trainer
Hugh Munro (Canadian politician) (1854–1939)
Hugh Munro (New Brunswick settler) (1764–1846)
Sir Hugh Munro, 8th Baronet (1763–1848)
Hugh Munro-Lucas-Tooth (1903–1985), British Conservative politician

See also
Clan Munro, for less notable persons named Hugh Munro